Ranu Mukherjee (born 1966) is an Indian-American artist and educator based in San Francisco, California. Her multi-media work combines film and painting in what she has coined a "hybrid film." She co-founded the arts collective, Orphan Drift.

Education 
Ranu Mukherjee received her Master of Arts at the Royal College of Art in London, England after earning a Bachelor of Fine Arts at the Massachusetts College of Art and Design in Boston, Massachusetts.

Art career
Best known for creating strongly colored large scale installations that combine mediums such as print, paint, and drawings, her work has focus on topics such as colonialism, feminism, and ecology. 

Mukherjee has stated that most of her work comes from a neo-futurist perspective as she aims to generate creative thinking among her audience. She also penned the term "hybrid film" as a label for her animated art that combines painted, photographic, and digital work into unique pieces. 

Along with one of the founding artists, Maggie Roberts, Suzzane Karakashian, and Erle Stenberg, Mukherjee is a member of the collaborative Orphan Drift artist group. Often described as sci-fi because of their focus on underground music and technology, the group is known for their complex works that use sampling of other art to provide a remix using print, video, and text as their mediums. Most of their work focuses on subjects such as cyber-feminism and post structuralism.

After earning her degrees in art, she began teaching at Goldsmiths College in London in 1994. In 2002 She moved to San Francisco, California, where she teaches at California College of the Arts.

Exhibitions

Solo exhibitions 
2018 A Bright Stage, de Young Museum, San Francisco, CA
2017 Shivery Proof, Pennsylvania College of Art and Design, Lancaster, PA
2017 Shadowtime, Gallery Wendy Norris, San Francisco, CA
2016 Phantasmagoria, Table Arts Center, Charleston, IL
2015 Extracted: A Trilogy by Ranu Mukherjee, Asian Art Museum, San Francisco, CA
2016 Phantasmagoric, Los Angeles County Museum of Art, Los Angeles CA
2012 Telling Fortunes, San Jose Museum of Art, San Jose, CA

Group exhibitions 
2018 "Be Not Still", di Rosa Center for Contemporary Art, Napa, CA

Collections 

 San José Museum of Art 
Asian Art Museum, San Francisco

Publications

Bibliography 
 Dance Magazine. “Building Bridges.” Dance Magazine. Dance Magazine, October 1, 2020
 “Ranu Mukherjee.” In The Make. Accessed March 19, 2021
 “Ranu Mukherjee - Gallery Wendi Norris: San Francisco.” Gallery Wendi Norris | San Francisco. Gallery Wendi Norris | San Francisco, October 20, 2020

References

External links 
Official website

1966 births
Living people
20th-century American women artists
21st-century American women artists
21st-century Indian women artists
Indian women contemporary artists